Caballeronia udeis is a bacterium from the genus Caballeronia and family Burkholderiaceae which has been reported to perform biological nitrogen fixation and promote plant growth

References 

Burkholderiaceae
Bacteria described in 2013